Akshay Pratap Singh alias Gopal Bhaiya (born 14 April 1970) is an Indian politician from Pratapgarh (Lok Sabha constituency) in Uttar Pradesh. He is the member of Uttar Pradesh Legislative Council.

Political career
He won the Pratapgarh seat in 2004 from Samajwadi Party.  However, he lost the 2009 Indian general elections to Rajkumari (princess) Ratna Singh.

In April 2022 at Uttar Pradesh Member of Legislative Council election he defeated BJP candidate Haripratap Singh by a margin of 1,091 and becoming MLC for the fifth time at Pratapgarh.

Personal life
He is the son of Shri Lal Shivpratap Singh, the younger brother of the heir of Jamon estate.

He is the nephew of ex-MP Barabanki late Raja Dr. Rudra Pratap Singh (Raja Jamon Estate).  
He is the close friend  of the politician Raja Bhaiya.

Controversies
Akshay Pratap Singh is facing several criminal cases, including one that is being investigated by the Central Bureau of Investigation.

References

He studied in jamon government inter college

1970 births
Living people
Indian politicians convicted of crimes
People from Uttar Pradesh
People from Pratapgarh, Uttar Pradesh
India MPs 2004–2009
Samajwadi Party politicians
Lok Sabha members from Uttar Pradesh
Members of the Uttar Pradesh Legislative Council
Jansatta Dal (Loktantrik) politicians
Samajwadi Party politicians from Uttar Pradesh